Karnataka State Film Award for Best Director is a state film award of the Indian state of Karnataka  given during the annual Karnataka State Film Awards. The award honors Kannada language films. This award is presented to the Director of First Best Film award-winning film. This award is named after H. L. N. Simha. The first director of Kannada Cinema who was brought First National Award to Kannada Cinema.

Superlatives

Award winners
The following is a complete list of award winners and the name of the films for which they won.

See also
 Cinema of Karnataka
 List of Kannada-language films

References

Karnataka State Film Awards
Kannada-language films